Blush is a 2021 computer-animated science fiction short film inspired by a true story from writer and director Joe Mateo, produced by Heather Schmidt Feng Yanu and executive produced by John Lasseter, David Ellison and Dana Goldberg. Developed from Skydance Animation, the short film follows an astronaut falling in love with an alien on a small planet. The film was decided in memory of Mary Ann R. Mateo who passed from breast cancer. It was released on Apple TV+ on October 1, 2021.

Plot
The short film opens up with an unnamed astronaut planting a garden in his spaceship but doesn’t realize that a meteor is on its way to crashing into the spaceship. As a result, his spaceship is destroyed, and he is left alone on a small deserted planet. He later removes plants from his garden and plants them on the planet, but in a matter of hours, the plants wither without air or water. He later witnesses another spaceship crash into the planet, which makes him believe there was someone on the ship. His plants suddenly regrow and create a tree, and notices an pinkish female alien with ribbon hair making the tree grow. They later develop a relationship based on love at first sight, and the alien later removes plants from the spaceship to plant them into the planet, essentially making it a larger garden. The astronaut later decides to remove his helmet, but nearly dies from asphyxia. The alien decides to give him some of her air to make him breathe.

Some months later, the astronaut spends his time with her, and taught her a few things like eating mangos. As the years go by, the couple develops their relationship and is seen having two daughters who have their own treats from their parents, a older girl with her mother's hair but closely realistic to her father's and a young girl with her father's hair but closely to her mother's ribbon hair. The alien later is seen as weak, to the point where she can no longer eat and/or walk. As a result, the planet withers and she dies into an aurora, which causes the astronaut to nearly die from asphyxia again til he nearly lives when he wakes up to his daughters, who are giving him air so that he can breathe again and make the planet regrows in an instant, revealing they have their mother's powers in them.

During the post-credits scenes, as he’s sleeping with his daughters and a pet alien dog, the astronaut witnesses another spaceship crash into the planet. Curious though, he and his daughters go to check out only to discover something that made him blush.

Production

Development
The idea for the film came from story artist Joe Mateo who lost his wife Mary Ann four and a half years ago to breast cancer. Suffering from a panic attack, his daughters symbolized his air. The film was announced later on as Skydance Animation's first production to debut with Apple Studios distributing it, making it the first Skydance film to be from Apple TV+. On October 1, 2021, Skydance Animation released its first short film inspired by a true story from director Joe Mateo called Blush. It was released on Apple TV+ as part of their multi-year deal.

Animation
Following the purchase of Ilion Animation Studios from Skydance, animation was provided by Skydance Animation Madrid and was also made in Los Angeles. Production was done remotely during the COVID-19 pandemic.

Music
The score is provided by Chinese-Malaysian film composer Joy Ngiaw who makes her first musical debut into scoring an animation short film.

Reception

Critical response
Female Frist gave it a positive review over the short film and its ending.

Accolades

References

External links
 

2020s American animated films
2020s animated short films
Apple TV+ original films
Animated films without speech
American science fiction films
American children's animated films
American computer-animated films
Skydance Media films
Skydance Animation films
Films impacted by the COVID-19 pandemic